The River at the Center of the World: A Journey Up the Yangtze, and Back in Chinese Time is a book by Simon Winchester. It details his travels up the Yangtze river in China and was first published in 1996.

Viewing an ancient Chinese painting scroll drawn by Wang Hui gives the author the inspiration on how to structure his book. He starts his journey in Shanghai, at the Yangtze river's delta, and makes his way upriver to the headwaters. At the same time, his narration also makes a journey back in time, writing about contemporary times in Shanghai and Nanjing, and writing about events that date back increasingly farther in cities upriver.

He makes the travel with a companion — a Chinese woman who is referred to in the book only as Lily to protect her identity. The chapter titled A New Great Wall is devoted to the Three Gorges Dam, then under construction and fully operational as of 2012.

References

1996 non-fiction books
Books about China
Books by Simon Winchester
British travel books
Henry Holt and Company books
English non-fiction books
American travel books
Yangtze River